Beth Meyers (born May 29, 1959) is an American social worker and Democratic politician.  She was a member of the Wisconsin State Assembly from 2015 through 2022, representing the 74th Assembly district, in northern Wisconsin.

Biography
Born in Bayfield, Wisconsin, Meyers received her bachelor's degree in sociology from Northland College in December 1989. She worked for the Red Cliff Tribe as family services division chief from 1990 to 1999, and later worked as the executive director of CORE Community Services, a nonprofit group serving seniors in the area around Chequamegon Bay. Meyers served on the Bayfield County, Wisconsin, Board of Supervisors from 2010 until she resigned in 2015 to concentrate on her duties in the Assembly. She has also served as chair of the Bayfield County Health Board and Library Board, and as a member of the Northern Lights Services Board and of Bayfield County's Executive Committee, Sheriff's Committee, and Tribal-County Relations Committee.

On November 4, 2014, Meyers was elected to the Wisconsin State Assembly as a Democrat replacing Janet Bewley (also a Democrat), who was elected to the Wisconsin State Senate. She is the ranking member on the Assembly's Committee on Long-Term Care and Committee on Energy and Utilities, and a member of the Committees on Financial Institutions, Transportation, and Rural Development, the Special Committee on State-Tribal Relations, the Speaker's Task Forces on Foster Care and Suicide Prevention, and the Wisconsin Department of Justice's Missing and Murdered Indigenous Women Task Force.

On January 6, 2022, she announced that she would not seek re-election.

Political positions

Meyers supported Governor Tony Evers's attempt to expand BadgerCare, which she considered useful for the recovery from the COVID-19 pandemic, stating, "[W]e have a shortage of workers in this state. And what we need is for them to be healthy. We can’t have people who are supposed to be going to their job calling in sick… If their employer can’t provide them health care, we should be able to help them with this money." She also supports state investment to help northern Wisconsin recover economically from the pandemic.

Meyers supports greater government investment in broadband internet access, which she considers essential to northern Wisconsin's economic development; she has stated that the US Department of Agriculture's $80.9million investment in expansion of rural broadband under Donald Trump was not sufficient to make a noticeable improvement.

Meyers supports strong regulation of pollution to protect clean running water, particularly as applied to mining; for this reason she opposed the development of an iron mine in the Penokee Hills of Iron County, Wisconsin, in 2014.

In 2016, after the previous year's legislative session on the budget lasted 12 hours, extending into the early morning of the day after it began, Meyers proposed a bill which would require votes on the budget to happen during "normal waking hours", so that citizens would be able to observe the debates and votes.

Meyers was one of the Democratic State Assembly members who, for the sake of safety from the COVID-19 pandemic, chose to hold a virtual inauguration ceremony after the 2020 election rather than attend the in-person State Assembly inauguration planned by the Republicans.

Electoral history

2014

2016

2018

2020

Personal life
Meyers had two children and was divorced prior to attending college. She lives in Russell, Wisconsin, with her husband, Kevin Buzicky.

References

External links
 Official website
 Campaign website
 
 

1959 births
Living people
People from Bayfield, Wisconsin
Northland College (Wisconsin) alumni
County supervisors in Wisconsin
Women state legislators in Wisconsin
Democratic Party members of the Wisconsin State Assembly
American social workers
21st-century American politicians
21st-century American women politicians